Wang Xuefeng (born April 1966) is a Chinese diplomat and politician. He is the Chinese ambassador to Botswana and former Chinese Ambassador to Samoa.

Early life and career

Wang was born in Jianhu County, Jiangsu, China, in April 1966. He obtained a bachelor of arts degree from Nanjing University. In 1988, he joined the Ministry of Foreign Affairs of the People's Republic of China. Between 2011 and 2013, he was the minister at the Embassy of China in India. He was the Consulate-General of China in Kolkata for two years (2013–2015).

Prior to his appointment as the Chinese Ambassador to Botswana, he was the Special Envoy for the China-Pacific Islands Forum Dialogue.

References

1966 births
Living people
Nanjing University alumni
Ambassadors of China to Botswana
Ambassadors of China to Samoa